Penn State Berks-Lehigh Valley may refer to:

Penn State Berks, a commonwealth campus of Pennsylvania State University located in Berks County, PA
Penn State Lehigh Valley, a commonwealth campus of Pennsylvania State University located in Fogelsville, PA